The Erzberg Rodeo is an Austrian motorcycle enduro event started in 1995 and held annually in May or June, run on ore.  It is the largest of its kind in Europe.

The Erzberg Rodeo is part of the Red Bull Hard Enduro Series, together with Red Bull Romaniacs, Red Bull Minas Riders, Red Bull Megawatt, Red Bull Sea to Sky, and Roof of Africa. In 2018 it joined the World Enduro Super Series, which became the FIM Hard Enduro World Championship in 2021.

Races
The four-day event consists of the following races:

 Thursday: "2 - cylinder elite class", two runs (2005 was the first, with about 60 starters) on the prologue route.
Since 2008, the Rodeo-X Endurocross competition, instead of the elite class, has been held on Thursday.  The 2-cylinder machines start in the normal "Iron Road Prologue" in class "Desert Bomber".

During the event the Rodeo-X shows some of the world's best motocross riders doing spectacular stunts and breakneck jumps. Since 2009 has been part of this program and on Thursday, another side event, the so-called Rocket Ride. In this steep slope race, which is held on one of the slopes of the Hare Scramble start, 300 riders start the 3-part slope to climb in record time. The top 48 riders in the qualification round then go to a knockout system in groups of 6 riders, each of which the top 3 to qualify for the next round at the end of the Rocket Ride Champion determined.

 Friday and Saturday: one run of the "Iron Road Prologue" on a 13 km long gravel path to the vicinity of the summit. The prologue is also the qualifying for Sunday. Here several classes start: Desert Bomber (multi-cylinder bikes), street bikes, scooters and mopeds, women's class until 2004 Standard Singles (street-legal single-cylinder enduro) and since 2004 Quads. The starting field is limited to 1,500 participants. The starters go in 20 to 40 seconds interval between 9.00 and about 17:00 on track.
Since 2008, competitors from over 40 countries competed.

 Sunday 12:00 to 16:00: the highlight of the "Red Bull Hare Scramble". The top 500 of the prologue are eligible to start on Sunday. The route is changed every year. For the 35 km long route, the winners usually require between one and a half and two hours. Of the 500 starters, rarely more than 30 come within the four-hour-long race to the finish.

History
For the economically weak region, the Erzberg Rodeo is a growing source of income and is supported not only by the local politics but also the Austrian state of Styria.

Karl Katoch is the organizer of this international event and is also considered as its founder.

2015: The 2015 hare scramble took an interesting turn with the addition of several new difficult areas of the course. A section known as Carl's Dinner was revamped to be longer and more difficult, as well as the addition of a new impassable section, known simply as Downtown. A section where riders were forced down into a ravine and were forced to climb a very steep muddy hill. First to arrive was Graham Jarvis after passing Walker shortly before due to a blown radiator on Walkers bike. Second to arrive to the new Downtown section was Alfredo Gomez who had also passed Walker for the same reason. After a while Walker was able to let his bike cool down and ascend a hill he was previously stuck on, to which he then met Jarvis and Gomez at Downtown and was shortly followed by Andreas Lettenbichler. After getting stuck as well, the four riders and friends banded together to ensure they all made it up the hill, each one helping the others pull their bike up in an act that can only be described as true respect as competitors and friendship. When all four reached the top, they had very little time to finish, roughly 20 minutes, as the friends made their way coasting in celebration to the finish where they all took the podium with quick succession.

Hare Scramble winners 

Source: Results of Red Bull Erzberg Rodeo

References

External links 
 Erzbergrodeo.at

Motorcycle racing in Austria
Motorcycle races
Dirt biking